Gregory James Davidson is an Australian cricket umpire. Davidson played in Sydney Grade Cricket for Parramatta District Cricket Club, spending time as first grade captain. Davidson turned to umpiring after retiring from playing in his late 30s. He made his first-class cricket debut in 2013 in Hobart.

References

External links

Living people
Australian cricket umpires
1970 births
People from Parramatta